The 1992 Men's Ice Hockey World Championships was the 56th such event sanctioned by the International Ice Hockey Federation (IIHF). Teams representing a record 32 countries participated in several levels of competition. The competition also served as qualifications for group placements in the 1993 competition.

The top Championship Group A tournament took place in Czechoslovakia from 28 April to 10 May 1992, with games played in Prague and Bratislava. This would be the last championship held in that nation before the dissolution of Czechoslovakia eight months later. Twelve teams took part, with the first round being split into two groups of six, with the four best teams from each group advancing to the quarter-finals. Sweden retained their title, beating Finland 5–2 in the final, and becoming world champions for the sixth time. This was Finland's first medal in a World Championship.

The Championship Group A pools were drawn the same as the 1992 Olympics in Albertville two months earlier, but yielded much different results. Switzerland was able to tie both Russia and Canada to earn a spot in the quarter-finals. Germany, after an opening loss to Finland, won four straight to also advance to the quarter-finals, where they faced Switzerland.  The Swiss prevailed, making the top 4 for the first time since 1953, and moved on to meet a Swedish team that had shut-out the Russians.  The Swedes led by three after the first and easily moved on to the gold medal game. There was nothing easy about the other semi-final, where the Finns had to come from behind to tie Czechoslovakia in the third period, then advanced to the finals with a shootout win. The Czechoslovaks, playing for the last time as that nation, beat the Swiss to settle for bronze, while Sweden, led by Mats Sundin, beat Finland for gold.

New entrants Greece, Israel, Luxembourg and Turkey iced teams in a secondary tier of Group C. South Africa appeared for the first time since 1966. In Group B, the Socialist Federal Republic of Yugoslavia made their final World Championship appearance before the breakup of that nation. The Federal Republic of Yugoslavia resumed Yugoslavia's former position in Group C in 1995, while breakaway nations Croatia and Slovenia would appear in the qualifiers for Group C of the 1993 World Championship.

World Championship Group A (Czechoslovakia)

First round

Group 1

Group 2

Consolation Round 11–12 Place 

Poland was relegated to Group B.

Playoff round

Quarterfinals

Semifinals

Match for third place

Final

Ranking and statistics

Tournament Awards
Best players selected by the directorate:
Best Goaltender:       Tommy Söderström
Best Defenceman:       Róbert Švehla
Best Forward:          Mats Sundin
Media All-Star Team:
Goaltender:  Markus Ketterer
Defence:  František Musil,  Timo Jutila
Forwards:  Petr Hrbek,  Mats Sundin,  Jarkko Varvio

Final standings
The final standings of the tournament according to IIHF:

Scoring leaders
List shows the top skaters sorted by points, then goals.
Source:

Leading goaltenders
Only the top five goaltenders, based on save percentage, who have played 50% of their team's minutes are included in this list.
Source:

World Championship Group B (Austria)
Played in Klagenfurt Austria 2–12 April.  The hosts went undefeated to return to Group A for the first time since 1957.

Austria was promoted to Group A, while Yugoslavia was relegated to Group C but would not play there until 1995.

World Championship Group C1 (Great Britain)
Played in Hull Great Britain 18–24 March.  The hosts, led by Scot Tony Hand and Canadian Kevin Conway, won all five games easily.

Great Britain was promoted to Group B while no team was relegated.

World Championship Group C2 (South Africa)
Played in Johannesburg South Africa 21–28 March.  Though called 'C2' it was no different from being in 'Group D'.  Spain completely dominated, playing against five essentially new hockey nations.  Only South Africa had participated before, and they last played in 1966.

Spain and later South Africa qualified for 1993 Group C.  The others had to play in qualification tournaments in November 1992.

Citations

See also
World Juniors
Women's Championships

References
Complete results

IIHF Men's World Ice Hockey Championships
World
1992
April 1992 sports events in Europe
May 1992 sports events in Europe
Sports competitions in Prague
Sports competitions in Bratislava
1990s in Prague
1990s in Bratislava
March 1992 sports events in Europe
International ice hockey competitions hosted by the United Kingdom
International ice hockey competitions hosted by Austria
1991–92 in Austrian ice hockey
1991–92 in British ice hockey
1992 in South African ice hockey
International ice hockey competitions hosted by South Africa
Sports competitions in Klagenfurt
Sport in Kingston upon Hull
1990s in Johannesburg
Sports competitions in Johannesburg
1990s in Kingston upon Hull